"Boys (Summertime Love)" is a song by Italian singer Sabrina, released in May 1987 as the third single from her self-titled debut studio album (1987). The song topped the charts in France (where it became the first number-one single by an Italian singer since 1984) and Switzerland, while peaking within the top five in Austria, Belgium, Finland, West Germany, Ireland, the Netherlands, Norway, Spain, and Sweden

It was Sabrina's first single to be released in the United Kingdom, reaching number three on the UK Singles Chart in June 1988. Outside Europe, "Boys (Summertime Love)" peaked at number 11 in Australia and number six in South Africa. The song was re-released as a remixed version twice: in France in 1995, retitled as "Boys '95", and in 2003 as "Boys Boys Boys (The Dance Remixes)".

Critical reception
William Shaw from Smash Hits wrote, "First Italy gave us the magnificent Spagna, now we have the next Euro-phenomenon Sabrina to contend with. She sings a rather nicely inane tune about boys which jigs about infectiously enough as eurodisco tunes invariably do, but which is somewhat marred by the fact that it's all about hanging around on the beach in the summertime, which is rather inappropriate in January." Another editor, Richard Lowe, said, "Well, it's another brilliantly tragic disco record and if it's not a hit this summer after spurring millions of people to make buffoons of themselves in discos while on "vacation" I'll eat my hat."

Music video

The accompanying music video for "Boys (Summertime Love)" was filmed at the Florida hotel in Jesolo, Italy. In it, Sabrina splashes about in a swimming pool, while her bikini top keeps sliding down, thus repeatedly revealing varying amounts of her nipples. As a result, the BBC added black bars around the image when the video was aired on Top of the Pops in June 1988, effectively cropping it into widescreen. It remains one of the most downloaded video clips on the Internet.

During an interview with Nino Firetto on the Music Box program on Super Channel in late 1988, Sabrina explained that the video for "Boys" was originally created to be a segment in a magazine show. This was Sabrina's explanation of why its style more closely matched that of Italian magazine shows of the time (more overtly sexualised) than that of the traditional music video of the time.

Track listings

 7-inch single
A. "Boys (Summertime Love)" – 3:56
B. "Get Ready (Holiday Rock)" – 3:20

 Dutch 7-inch single
A. "Boys (Summertime Love)" – 3:30
B. "Get Ready (Holiday Rock)" – 3:30

 12-inch single
A. "Boys (Summertime Love)" – 5:30
B. "Boys (Summertime Love)" (dub version) – 5:35

 German 12-inch single – Remixed
A. "Boys (Summertime Love)" (remix by Wally Brill) – 8:43
B. "Boys (Summertime Love)" (dub version) – 5:40

 UK and Australian 12-inch single
A. "Boys (Summertime Love)" – 5:40
B1. "Boys (Summertime Love)" (dub version) – 5:40
B2. "Get Ready (Holiday Rock)" – 3:30

 French CD single
"Boys (Summertime Love)" – 3:50
"Boys (Summertime Love)" (remix) – 5:40
"Hot Girl" – 3:22

 12-inch single – Remix by Pete Hammond
A. "Boys (Summertime Love)" (remix by Pete Hammond) – 7:01
B1. "Boys (Summertime Love)" (dub version) – 5:35
B2. "Get Ready (Holiday Rock)" – 3:20

 US and Canadian 12-inch single
A1. "Boys (Summertime Love)" (12″ version) – 7:01
A2. "Boys (Summertime Love)" (7″ version) – 3:50
B1. "Boys (Summertime Love)" (Summertime mix) – 5:40
B2. "Boys (Summertime Love)" (dub) – 5:40
B3. "Get Ready (Holiday Rock)" – 3:30

 French CD single (1995)
"Boys" (Radio Lovers remix) – 5:36
"Boys" (N.Y.D.P. mix) – 3:40

 French 12-inch single (1995)
A1. "Boys" (Radio Lovers remix) – 5:36
A2. "Boys" (N.Y.D.P. mix) – 3:40
B1. "Boys" (Chorus remix) – 5:35
B2. "Boys" (Only Music remix) – 5:35

 German 12-inch single – The Dance Remixes (2003)
A. "Boys (Summertime Love)" (Renegade Master's remix) – 6:38
B1. "Boys (Summertime Love)" (Doug Laurent remix) – 5:08
B2. "Boys (Summertime Love)" (Future Shock Less Vocal mix) – 5:08

Charts

Weekly charts

Year-end charts

Certifications

Bearforce 1 version
European band Bearforce 1 made a cover of the song in 2008, including the chorus of "Boys (Summertime Love)". Its music video features four men dancing to the song and lipsyncing.

See also
 List of number-one singles of 1988 (France)

References

External links
 

1987 singles
1987 songs
Music video controversies
Number-one singles in Switzerland
Sabrina Salerno songs
SNEP Top Singles number-one singles
Songs written by Claudio Cecchetto